Patrick Joosten (born 14 April 1996) is a Dutch professional footballer who plays as a winger for Apollon Limassol. He has also represented the Netherlands at under-21 level.

Club career
On 31 December 2019, Sparta Rotterdam announced Joosten would be joining them on loan from FC Utrecht for the rest of the season.

On 6 August 2020, Joosten signed a three-year contract with Groningen.

On 11 January 2022, Joosten was loaned to Cambuur for the rest of the season.

Honours
Individual
Eredivisie Player of the Month: January 2019

References

External links
 

Netherlands stats at OnsOranje

1996 births
Living people
Footballers from Nijmegen
Association football midfielders
Dutch footballers
Netherlands under-21 international footballers
Netherlands youth international footballers
Dutch sportspeople of Surinamese descent
Dutch expatriate sportspeople in Cyprus
Expatriate footballers in Cyprus
NEC Nijmegen players
FC Utrecht players
VVV-Venlo players
Sparta Rotterdam players
FC Groningen players
SC Cambuur players
Eredivisie players
Eerste Divisie players
SV Orion players
Apollon Limassol FC players